The 2002 Copa Libertadores Final was a two-legged football match-up between Paraguayan side Olimpia and São Caetano of Brazil, to determine the 2002 Copa Libertadores champion. 

After a 2–2 tie aggregate, the series was decided by penalty shootout, with Olimpia defeating São Caetano by 4–2.

Qualified teams

Venues

Route to the finals

Final summary

First leg

Second leg

References

1
Copa Libertadores Finals
Copa Libertadores Final 2002
Copa Libertadores Final 2002
Copa Libertadores Finals 2002